Mary's College is a voluntary secondary school in Mullingar, Westmeath, Ireland. It is based partly in the Hevey Institute and elsewhere in extensions which were built in the 1970s and 2000s. The school is a member of the Edmund Rice Schools Trust which is a network of Catholic secondary schools in Ireland, and is located adjacent to St Mary's Primary School and the Cathedral of Christ the King.

History and recent years 
The foundation of the school in the town was largely due to the philanthropy of a local retired brewer and landowner, James Hevey. A site for the school was obtained from Lord Granard at an annual rent of £15. Within 20 years, during which time the area was devastated by the Great Famine in the 1840s and as a result delayed the opening of the school. Hevey's last will and testament of 1835, which had been looked over by Daniel O'Connell, contained the following bequest: “all my right and interest in the town and in the lands of Bryanstown for the support, maintenance, and education of poor children of the parish of Mullingar”. In 1837, the Hevey Trust was set up to ensure that the benefactor's purpose was fulfilled. The Hevey Institute was built to the designs of James Bourke, who died in 1871. On , a Saint Mary's Primary School was opened on the grounds. A few years later, in 1972, a secondary school extension containing modernised classrooms was built at a cost of IE£124,060 (€1.75 million in today's money) which was extended in 2003 at a cost of €3 million that included a state of the art technology room which opened in February 2005. On 16 November 2012, the official opening of the restored Hevey Institute was held by members of the Hevey Trust. Joseph O'Meara, a former mathematics teacher in the school, served as principal from 1994 to 2015 when Malachy Flanagan, a geography teacher, was voted to take his role after his retirement in May 2015. Malachy Flanagan severed as principal from 2015 to 2022 as he decided to move to another school.
The school's admission policy states that it accepts students of non-Catholic faiths, however it does not state anything in relation to those who have no faith.

School committees 
The parent's council is a committee set up by the parents of students in the school and other volunteers. The council debates on issues relevant to the ongoing development of the school, and on issues affecting students and school life. The student's council is a committee set up by students in the school. An election takes place each year, around the end of April for the next year's candidates. The student's council asks students on changes that they'd like to see changed to the school such as variations of food offered by the canteen and outdoor seating.

Extracurricular activities 

Gaelic games are the most prevalent sports played in the school with success in all codes, including hurling, Gaelic football and handball. Other clubs and societies include badminton, golf, music, basketball and drama.

Enrolment

The school is a boys only school since it was established in the 19th century. Transition Year is offered in the school, and is an optional choice with a set fee for the year.

Notable alumni
 Niall Breslin, pop musician
 James Geoghegan, judge
 Niall Horan, pop musician
 John Joe Nevin, sportsman 
 Willie Penrose, politician

References

Boys' schools in the Republic of Ireland
Congregation of Christian Brothers secondary schools in the Republic of Ireland
1856 establishments in Ireland
Educational institutions established in 1856
Secondary schools in County Westmeath